Cavendish  is a local service district and designated place in the Canadian province of Newfoundland and Labrador.

Geography 
Cavendish is in Newfoundland within Subdivision E of Division No. 1. Cavendish is located on Route 80, off the Route 1 (Trans Canada Highway) exit at Whitbourne. Soils are mapped as stony loam podzols of the Cochrane and Turk's Cove series.

Demographics 

Government 
Cavendish is a local service district (LSD) that is governed by a committee responsible for the provision of certain services to the community. The chair of the LSD committee is Roger Pennell.

See also 
List of communities in Newfoundland and Labrador
List of designated places in Newfoundland and Labrador
List of local service districts in Newfoundland and Labrador

References 

Designated places in Newfoundland and Labrador
Local service districts in Newfoundland and Labrador